"Stolen" is a song by British singer Jay Sean, released as the third and final single from his debut album, Me Against Myself (2004), on 25 October 2004. The song peaked at number four on the UK Singles Chart, making it Sean's highest-charting UK single until "Down" in 2009, which reached number three. The song contains a sample from the classic Bollywood song "Chura Liya Hai" sung by Asha Bhosle from the 1973 film Yaadon Ki Baaraat.

Music video
Bollywood actress Bipasha Basu makes an appearance in the video.

Track listings

UK CD1
 "Stolen" (radio edit)
 "Who Is Kamaljit?"

UK CD2
 "Stolen" (original full length version)
 "Stolen" (Syklone Remix)
 "Stolen" (Rishi Rich Remix)
 "Stolen" (video)

UK 12-inch single
A1. "Stolen" (original full length version) – 3:40
A2. "Stolen" (radio edit) – 3:40
B1. "Stolen" (Rishi Rich Remix) – 3:48
B2. "Stolen" (Syklone Remix) – 3:40

Charts

Weekly charts

Year-end charts

References

2004 singles
2004 songs
Jay Sean songs
Relentless Records singles
Song recordings produced by Stargate (record producers)
Songs written by Jay Sean
Virgin Records singles